"Constellation Prize" is a song by Swedish singer Robin Bengtsson. The song was released in Sweden as a digital download on 28 February 2016, and was written by Bobby Ljunggren, Henrik Wikström, Mark Hole, and Martin Eriksson. It took part in Melodifestivalen 2016, and qualified to the final from the first semi-final. It placed fifth in the final.

Track listing

Charts

Weekly charts

Year-end charts

Release history

References

2015 songs
2016 singles
Capitol Records singles
Swedish pop songs
English-language Swedish songs
Robin Bengtsson songs
Songs written by Bobby Ljunggren
Songs written by Henrik Wikström
Melodifestivalen songs of 2016